Beerfest is a 2006 American comedy film directed by Jay Chandrasekhar and starring the comedy troupe Broken Lizard, which comprises Chandrasekhar, Kevin Heffernan, Steve Lemme, Paul Soter, and Erik Stolhanske. The film co-stars Nat Faxon, Will Forte, Ralf Möller, Mo'Nique, Eric Christian Olsen, Jürgen Prochnow, and Cloris Leachman. It was theatrically released on August 25, 2006.

The film's continual reference to a drinking game named "Das Boot" (drinking from a huge boot-shaped glass) is a tongue-in-cheek reference to the German co-star Jürgen Prochnow who was the star of the German film "Das Boot" (The Boat).

Plot

At the funeral of their German-born grandfather Johann von Wolfhausen, half-wit brothers Jan and Todd Wolfhouse discover that family tradition demands that they travel to Munich at Oktoberfest to spread his cremated ashes at the Theresienwiese. There, the brothers unintentionally start an altercation that takes down an entire Oktoberfest tent. They then participate in Beerfest, an underground drinking game tournament run by Baron Wolfgang von Wolfhausen, where they discover that the von Wolfhausens are related to the Wolfhouses. The German team angrily denies the family ties, revealing that Johann was a stable boy who stole the recipe for "ze greatest beer in all ze world" decades ago and ran away with his prostitute mother (the brothers' great grandmother), Great Gam Gam. Enraged by the mockery of their ancestors, Jan and Todd challenge the Germans to a drinking game. The brothers' defeat humiliates them in front of everybody, with Wolfgang pouring their grandfather's ashes on them and Jan gets punched in the eye.

Swearing to get revenge on the Germans, Jan and Todd return to Colorado where they recruit their drinking friends from college—binge drinker Phil "Landfill" Krundle, Jewish scientist Charlie "Fink" Finklestein, and male prostitute Barry Badrinath—to assemble an American Beerfest team, though they do not divulge this to Great Gam Gam. During the team's year of training, Jan and Todd find out that their grandfather did not steal the family beer recipe, but was actually the rightful heir to the family brewery in Bavaria. The team uses the rediscovered recipe to brew Schnitzengiggle Beer, whose delicious taste fills them with awe.

After the German team receive a bottle of Schnitzengiggle in the mail, the Wolfhausen clan goes to America to take the recipe back. Following a confrontation between the Wolfhausens and Jan and Todd, the Wolfhausens forge evidence that the brothers' restaurant has health issues to put them out of business. Fink quits the team, having been fired due to a slipping performance at the lab. Meanwhile, Landfill catches Great Gam Gam's caregiver Cherry stealing the beer recipe for the Germans. He overwhelms Cherry in a fight, but is pushed into a vat full of beer that drowns him due to the yeast ingredient submerging him. Minutes later, Jan discovers Landfill's body. Thinking Landfill committed suicide because of the strain that his involvement was putting on their marriage, the team decides to disband.

After the funeral, Great Gam Gam reveals that she knew about Beerfest the entire time. She then motivates the bereaved team with a rousing speech, and everyone except Barry change their minds. Barry explains that he cannot join due to a traumatizing incident years ago during a game of table tennis, in which the big end of a racket was forcefully shoved up his anus. Sympathizing with Barry, Great Gam Gam encourages him to rise above it, causing him to relent and join the team. Shortly after, Landfill's Southern twin brother Gil reveals himself to the group and offers to join the team, which they accept. Like his brother; Gil can drink copious amounts of beer, and he even invites the other members of the team to call him "Landfill" in his memory.

In Germany, the team uses an empty wooden keg as a Trojan Horse to get inside, where they emerge to boos and jeers. The Americans are allowed to participate after Jan and Todd show how uncannily they resemble the two Beerfest founders, thus convincing the crowd of their von Wolfhausen ancestry. In the finals (bootline chug), Cherry gibes Gil about the death of his brother, causing him to crack and the Germans to win. Jan offers the Germans a double or nothing opportunity. The Germans tell Jan they already have the recipe and thus no need for a rematch, but Fink points out that Cherry only stole a recipe for a low-carbohydrate strawberry beer, prompting Wolfgang to have Cherry killed. When one of the von Wolfhausens knocks off Fink's yarmulke, he enters into a state of purely concentrated rage which allows him to coach the team to victory, barely gaining the win when the German team's anchor fails to finish "Das Boot" (Boot of beer) by one drop.

Cast

Production
Beerfest was filmed in Albuquerque, New Mexico. When asked about where the concept for the film came from, Jay Chandrasekhar said "We were at a Beer garden in Australia (wearing our police uniforms) and we went on stage and challenged the top five drinkers in the room to a chug off. The place exploded. We were winning, but then Paul Soter started drinking and we quickly lost. Then we had arm wrestling contests. Then Steve Lemme insulted national treasure, Russell Crowe and we had to be escorted out by security. We thought that would be a fun movie. The drinking beer part."

Release
Beerfest was theatrically released on August 25, 2006.

Two versions of the film have been released on home media: the theatrical version and an unrated version. The unrated version runs ten minutes longer and includes another eight brief scenes.

Critical response
On Rotten Tomatoes, the film holds an approval rating of 40% based on 107 reviews, with an average rating of 5.04/10. The website's critical consensus reads,  "Beerfest features some laugh-inducing gags, but is too long and the pacing too uneven to form a coherent, functioning comedy." On Metacritic, the film has a weighted average score of 46 out of 100, based on 25 critics, indicating "mixed or average reviews".

David Jenkins in Time Out magazine wrote it "appears to have been conceived on the back of a beermat and its trashy direction, nonexistent plot and dismal comic mugging would seem to suggest that preparations progressed no further". Jeannette Catsoulis of The New York Times disagreed: "Best viewed while sloshed, Beerfest is idiotic, tasteless and irrepressibly good-natured in other words, a frat-house classic".

Planned sequel
Despite the statement at the end of Beerfest that Potfest is "coming soon", Broken Lizard intended this as a joke to get publicity. They have stated both that fans were very supportive of the title and that Broken Lizard may decide to make an animated film of the same name. In July 2012, Broken Lizard member Jay Chandraskehar revealed the Smokefest might actually happen, and that Willie Nelson, Cheech of Cheech & Chong and Snoop Dogg agreed to appear in the movie. In June 2013, it was confirmed that the movie would be released after Super Troopers 2. In 2014, it was confirmed that it would be a live action film rather than the proposed animated film. It was later announced, in 2016, that a Beerfest TV series will air on CW Seed. As of October 2020 there have been no further announcements on the future of the project, thus it remains in development hell until further notice.

References

External links
Official website

2006 comedy films
2006 films
Broken Lizard
Films about families
Films about friendship
American films about revenge
Films directed by Jay Chandrasekhar
Films scored by Nathan Barr
Films set in Colorado
Films set in Munich
Films set in the Netherlands
Films shot in New Mexico
Films about beer
Legendary Pictures films
Warner Bros. films
2000s English-language films
2000s American films
English-language comedy films